Frederick John Durston (11 July 1893 – 8 April 1965) was an English first-class cricketer who played for Middlesex and England. He is a member of the Middlesex Hall of Fame.

Cricket career 
A tall fast bowler with the ability to make the ball "break back" after pitching, Durston came to the fore in Middlesex's County Championship-winning seasons of 1920 and 1921, having played only a handful of matches before then. In both years, he took more than 100 wickets and after taking 11 wickets for MCC against the all-conquering 1921 Australian team led by Warwick Armstrong, he was picked for the second Test match on his home ground, Lord's. But though he took five wickets for 136 runs in the match, he was dropped and never played for England again.

Durston played for Middlesex until 1933, turning increasingly to off-spin as he got older and stouter. In all, he took 1,314 wickets. His batting improved with age and in 1927 he shared an unbroken ninth-wicket partnership of 160 – scored in only 80 minutes – with Patsy Hendren against Essex at Leyton that remained as a Middlesex record until 2011.

Durston ran an indoor cricket school at Acton in London from 1924 to 1958.

Football career 
Durston also played football as a goalkeeper for Royal Engineers, Queens Park Rangers, Brentford, Northfleet United and Bedford Town.

The Hackney Gazette Newspaper reported that the Brentford registered goalkeeper Corporal Jack Durston made 2 appearances for Clapton Orient during the December holiday period of 1917 both against Chelsea. On Christmas Day at Chelsea in a 4–1 defeat and on Boxing Day a 2–1 defeat at Millfields, Homerton. Source: Neilson N. Kaufman, honorary historian of nearly fifty years to Leyton Orient FC.

Personal life 
Durston served with the Royal Engineers during the First World War.

References

External links
 
 Jack Durston at Cricket Archive

1893 births
1965 deaths
Military personnel from Bedfordshire
Brentford F.C. players
English footballers
English cricketers
England Test cricketers
London Counties cricketers
Middlesex cricketers
Players cricketers
Marylebone Cricket Club cricketers
People from Central Bedfordshire District
Northfleet United F.C. players
Bedford Town F.C. players
Association football goalkeepers
Royal Engineers soldiers
British Army personnel of World War I
Royal Engineers A.F.C. players
Queens Park Rangers F.C. players
English cricketers of 1919 to 1945
Footballers from Bedfordshire
Cricketers from Bedfordshire